Minuscule 86 (in the Gregory-Aland numbering), ε 1030 (Soden), is a Greek minuscule manuscript of the New Testament, on parchment leaves. Palaeographically it has been assigned to the 11th or 12th century.

Description 

The codex contains the text of the four Gospels, on 281 leaves (size 24 cm by 18 cm). The text is written in one column per page, 22-23 lines per page.

It contains Prolegomena, the Eusebian Canon tables at the beginning, synaxaria, and pictures.

The Greek text of the codex Kurt Aland did not place in any Category. 
Wisse did not make a Profile for this manuscript.

History 

The manuscript once was in Buda. It was bought by priest Micheal at Constantinople in 1183 for the Emperor Alexius II Commenus. It belonged to the library in Buda. In 1699 it was purchased by Carl Rayger. Since 1722 it was held at the Lycaeum at Pressburg. It was examined by Bengel (codex Byzantinus) and Endlicher. 

It is currently housed in at the Slovenská akadémia vied (394 kt), at Bratislava.

See also 

 List of New Testament minuscules
 Biblical manuscript
 Textual criticism

References

Further reading 

 

Greek New Testament minuscules
11th-century biblical manuscripts